Samuel Ebenezer Clement Devasahayam is the second Bishop of Thoothukudi - Nazareth Diocese of the Church of South India.

Early Years
Devasahayam did his college education at Pope's College at Sawyerpuram and gained Bachelor of Divinity from Tamil Nadu Theological Seminary.

Ecclesiastical Ministry
Devasahayam was ordained as Deacon in 1983 and as Presbyter in 1984 by S. Daniel Abraham, Bishop of Tirunelveli. He was elected and selected as the Bishop of Thoothukudi - Nazareth Diocese of the Church of South India in June 2017 and consecrated bishop at St. John's Cathedral, Nazareth on 11 June 2017 by CSI Moderator Thomas K Oommen.

References

 
 

1957 births
Living people
21st-century Anglican bishops in India
Tamil Nadu Theological Seminary alumni
Anglican bishops of Thoothukudi - Nazareth
People from Thoothukudi district